is a Japanese manga series written and illustrated by Atsushi Ohkubo. It is a spin-off of the main series, Soul Eater, taking place prior to the events of the manga. It began serialization in Square Enix's Monthly Shōnen Gangan magazine on January 12, 2011. An anime television series adaptation by Bones aired on TV Tokyo between April and July 2014 and was simulcast by Funimation in North America.

Plot

The Death Weapon Meister Academy (DWMA) is a special institution for humans who are born with the power to turn into weapons and the wielders of these weapons, called meisters. While the students of the EAT (Especially Advantaged Talent) class train themselves to become warriors of justice, the NOT (Normally Overcome Target) class is for those who just want to control their powers with the intent to not become a threat to others and to themselves. Tsugumi Harudori is a halberd demon weapon who takes part in the NOT class and befriends two meisters, Meme Tatane and Anya Hepburn, becoming indecisive about which one of them to choose as her partner. The series follows the daily lives of Tsugumi and her friends as they learn the ropes of the DWMA and have occasional encounters with the characters of the main series.

Media

Manga
The manga was serialized from the February 2011 issue of Square Enix's Monthly Shōnen Gangan sold on January 12, 2011 to the December 2014 issue sold on November 10, 2014. Square Enix published five tankōbon volumes between September 22, 2011 and December 22, 2015. The series is licensed in North America by Yen Press and is being simultaneously released in English alongside its Japanese counterpart.

Anime
An anime television series adaptation by Bones aired in Japan between April 8, 2014 and July 2, 2014 and was simulcast by Funimation.

Episode list

Reception
The first three of the manga volumes released by Yen Press are best sellers according to The New York Times.

Anime News Network had four editors review the first episode of the anime: Rebecca Silverman expressed intrigue in the series. She praised the character of Tsugumi Harudori for being interesting and introducing the world the story takes place in, concluding by saying that it deserves more episodes to see how it will move forward from that; Carl Kimlinger, although praising Masakazu Hashimoto for directing the series from a different perspective, expressed criticism in the lack of bravado and edge that Takuya Igarashi brought to the original series; Jacob Hope Chapman commented on how comparing it to the original series seemed fair, expressing disdain over the animation and characters for being bland and the overall tone resembling that of K-On!. The fourth reviewer, Theron Martin, gave two different opinions on the episode. He said that the change in tone and different art style will disappoint fans of the original series, while as a stand-alone show it might do better with its overall cutesy charm. Martin reviewed the complete series in 2015. Despite finding some inconsistency in the setting and some subpar action scenes, Martin gave praise to the main trio's presence, the moe-influenced animation and returning to the series' world as a prequel, concluding that, "Overall, Soul Eater Not! looks pretty good and can be quite pleasingly entertaining, provided that you do not go into it from Soul Eater expecting 'more of the same'. It sells its cute and fun factors well enough to stand on its own while also still throwing plenty of bones to fans of the original series."

References

External links
Soul Eater Not! at Square Enix 
 

Anime series based on manga
Bones (studio)
Comedy anime and manga
Comics spin-offs
Dark fantasy anime and manga
Funimation
Gangan Comics manga
Shōnen manga
Slice of life anime and manga
Soul Eater (manga)
TV Tokyo original programming
Yen Press titles